Zvi Shiloah (6 March 1911 10 October 2000) was an Israeli politician who served as a member of the Knesset for Tehiya in 1984.

Biography
Born Zvi Langsam in Boryslav, Austria-Hungary (today in Ukraine), Shiloah was educated in a local gymnasium. During his youth he was a member of the Gordonia movement. He made aliyah to Mandatory Palestine in 1932, and studied history at Tel Aviv University.

In 1934 he joined Mapai, and four years later began working for Herzliya Workers Council. In 1941 he enlisted to the Artillery Corps of the British Army, and headed a Jewish Brigade delegation to the Munich Displaced Persons camp.

In 1949 he became editor of HaDoar, a role he held until 1954. He was elected onto the Mapai central committee in 1950, and Herzliya city council in 1954. From 1960 until 1964 he was the city's deputy mayor. In 1965 he joined the new Rafi and became a member of its secretariat. In 1967 he was amongst the founders of the Movement for Greater Israel, and edited its biweekly publication Zot HaAretz. When Likud was formed by an alliance of several right-wing parties in 1973, he became a member of its directorate.

In 1977 he left Likud and was amongst the founders of Tehiya. He chaired the party's council, and was on its list for the 1981 elections. Although he failed to win a seat, he entered the Knesset on 7 March 1984 as a replacement for Hanan Porat, who had resigned. However, he lost his seat in the July 1984 elections.

He died in 2000 at the age of 89.

References

External links

1911 births
2000 deaths
People from Boryslav
Ukrainian Jews
Polish emigrants to Mandatory Palestine
Mapai politicians
Rafi (political party) politicians
Movement for Greater Israel politicians
Likud politicians
Tehiya politicians
Israeli trade unionists
Israeli journalists
British Army personnel of World War II
Tel Aviv University alumni
Jews from Galicia (Eastern Europe)
Austro-Hungarian Jews
20th-century Israeli Jews
Jews in Mandatory Palestine
Members of the 10th Knesset (1981–1984)
20th-century journalists